La cena di Natale is a 2016 Italian comedy film directed by Marco Ponti.

The film is a sequel to the 2015 film Io che amo solo te.

Cast
Riccardo Scamarcio as Damiano Scagliusi
Laura Chiatti as Chiara
Michele Placido as don Mimì
Maria Pia Calzone as Ninella Torres
Antonella Attili as Matilde
Eugenio Franceschini as Orlando Scagliusi
Antonio Gerardi as Franco Torres
Veronica Pivetti as Pina
Eva Riccobono as Daniela
Uccio De Santis as father Gianni
Dario Aita as Mario
Giulia Elettra Gorietti as Deborah
Crescenza Guarnieri as Maura
Ivana Lotito as Mariangela
Angelo De Matteis as Antonio
Massimo De Lorenzo as the doctor

References

External links

2016 films
2010s Italian-language films
2016 comedy films
Italian comedy films
Films directed by Marco Ponti
Films produced by Fulvio Lucisano
2010s Italian films